Elsham is a village and civil parish in North Lincolnshire, England. The population of the civil parish at the 2011 census was 400.

The A15 (built in 1978) traverses the old runways of the former RAF Elsham Wolds airfield. Close to the village is Elsham Hall.

Elsham Grade II* listed Anglican church, dedicated to All Saints, is of 12th century Early English origin. It was restored in 1874.

At Elsham there was an Augustinian priory; it was dissolved during the 1536 Suppression.

The village is the birthplace of the agricultural engineer Richard Hornsby, astronomer Wallace L. W. Sargent, and George Green, a recipient of the Medal of Honor in the American Civil War.

Elsham is the home of the Pipers Crisp Co., winners of 23 "Great Taste Awards Gold" since 2007.

References

External links

Villages in the Borough of North Lincolnshire
Civil parishes in Lincolnshire